Ang Singsing nang Dalagang Marmol ("The Ring of the Marble Maiden"), contemporarily rendered as Ang Singsing ng Dalagang Marmol in the Tagalog language, is a historical novel written by Filipino novelist, scholar, and labor leader Isabelo Florentino de los Reyes (also known as Isabelo de los Reyes, Sr.) before 1905.  It is one of the first historical novels written in the Philippines during the first decade of the 20th century (1900 to 1910). It was also one of the first novels during the period that was written using the technique of blending fact and fiction. Through the novel, De los Reyes revealed his knowledge of the actual events during the Philippine–American War, making the subject as "integral elements" of the book. Based on the original 1912 bookcover for the novel, Ang Singsing ng Dalagang Marmol is alternatively titled Si Liwayway ng Baliwag ("Liwayway of Baliwag").

History
The novel was originally written by De los Reyes in Tagalog, and was published in the Ang Kapatid ng Bayan (literally "The Sibling [Brother or Sister] of the Country") newspaper. De los Reyes translated the Tagalog version into the Spanish language.  The Spanish version was published in El Grito del Pueblo ("The Cry of the People") in 1905. The original cover featured Josefa Tiongson y Lara, more popularly known as "Jocelynang Baliwag", whom Isabelo Florentino de los Reyes courted and dedicated the novel with.  After the disappearance of the original Tagalog manuscript, the Spanish version was translated back into Tagalog by Filipino translator Carlos B. Raimundo.  The Tagalog translation made by Raimundo was published in 1912 with 32 pages by Tip. Santos Y Bernal in Manila during the American period (1898–1946).

In 2004, the Ateneo de Manila University Press republished Ang Singsing ng Dalagang Marmol by pairing it with Precioso Palma's Ipaghiganti Mo Ako...! ("Avenge Me...!").  The combined short novels or novelettes have similarities. Both tackles romance and relationship during wartime, wherein the characters "deal with forked road of separation" and reunion after the revelation of secrets.

Description
There are three main protagonists in Ang Singsing ng Dalagang Marmol. One is the unknown narrator, the second is Colonel Puso (literally "Colonel Heart"), and third is Liwayway, the colonel's girlfriend.  The narrator was a survivor of the Battle of Kingwa (also known as the Battle of Quingua), a battle between Filipino revolutionaries and American soldiers that occurred on 23 April 1899 in Kingwa, Bulacan (Quingua, Bulacan; now known as Plaridel, Bulacan).  The battle was a part of the Philippine–American War.  In the story, the unnamed narrator met Colonel Puso, a wounded Filipino soldier.  Colonel Puso confided with the narrator his relationship with Liwayway, a woman from Baliwag, Bulacan.  Liwayway's foster mother was against the relationship and took her away from Colonel Puso.  Colonel learns that Liwayway became the wife of an American.  However, it turns out that the news was not true – Liwayway did not marry - because in the end Colonel Puso and Liwayway met again eventually.  Liwayway disguised herself as an old woman. She reached the military camp where Colonel Puso was staying.  Liwayway nursed Colonel Puso and revealed her true identity to her lover.

References

External links
Ang Singsing nang Dalagang Marmol at Project Gutenberg
Ang Singsing nang Dalagang Marmol at Filipiniana.net
Ang Singsing ng Dalagang Marmol (The Ring of the Marble Maiden) at iTunes.apple.com (Apple Inc.)

Philippine novels
1905 novels
Tagalog-language novels
Historical novels
Philippine romance novels
Spanish-language novels
Novels set during the Philippine–American War
Novels set in the Philippines